Koliwara is a small town located in Sumerpur Tehsil in Pali district, Rajasthan, India. It lies 4 km. from Sumerpur, 3 km. from Bhagawan Mahavir Hospital on Jawai Bandh road. Nearest railway station is Jawai Bandh. There are 4 schools, one hospital, one veterinary hospital, one post office, and Gram Panchayat.  It is also famous for wood carving and artwork.
Bus service is available to village on hourly basis. The village is also connected to Jakhora by road.

Demographics
According to the 2011 census, the population of Koliwara was 3545. The male population was 1,842, while the female population was 1,703..
Koliwara is a small but well known village in Sumerpur tehsil. There is a blackboard and whiteboard factory. It's a publishing house of children books, maps and charts etc. The company name as Nandi-G Education(Group Company name is NANDI-G PUBLICATION PVT.LTD.) There is a lake located in the central part of the village.

Education 
Koliwara village has lower literacy rate compared to Rajasthan. In 2011, literacy rate of Koliwara village was 65.08% compared to 66.11% of Rajasthan. In Koliwara Male literacy stands at 79.87% while female literacy rate was 49.17%.

A new C.B.S.E board school and a college for higher education offering various courses has been opened near the outskirts of the village.

Caste Factor 
Koliwara village  has substantial population of Schedule Caste. Schedule Caste (SC) constitutes 26.74% while Schedule Tribe (ST) were 7.93% of total population in Koliwara village.

References 
 

Villages in Pali district